The 1984–85 FIBA European Cup Winners' Cup was the nineteenth edition of FIBA's 2nd-tier level European-wide professional club basketball competition, contested between national domestic cup champions, running from 2 October 1984, to 19 March 1985. It was contested by 20 teams, four less than in the previous edition.

FC Barcelona, runner-up in the 1983–84 edition of the Spanish Cup, was assigned the berth of the previous year's winner, Real Madrid, who would participate in that season's FIBA European Champions Cup instead.

In the final, held in Grenoble, FC Barcelona defeated Žalgiris, to win their first European trophy. It was the second title in a row for a Spanish League team.

Participants

First round

|}

Second round

|}

Automatically qualified to the Quarter finals group stage
 Intesit Caserta
 CAI Zaragoza

Quarterfinals

Semifinals

|}

Final
March 19, Palais des Sports, Grenoble

|}

References

External links
 1984–85 FIBA European Cup Winner's Cup @ linguasport.com
FIBA European Cup Winner's Cup 1984–85

FIBA
FIBA Saporta Cup